The 1997 Humboldt State Lumberjacks football team represented Humboldt State University during the 1997 NAIA football season. Humboldt State competed in the NAIA Columbia Football Association for the first time in 1997. They had previously been a member of the NCAA Division II Northern California Athletic Conference (NCAC).

The 1997 Lumberjacks were led by seventh-year head coach Fred Whitmire. They played home games at the Redwood Bowl in Arcata, California. Humboldt State finished the season with a record of two wins and eight losses (2–8, 1–4 CFA). The Lumberjacks were outscored by their opponents 173–332 for the season.

Schedule

Notes

References

Humboldt State
Humboldt State Lumberjacks football seasons
Humboldt State Lumberjacks football